Gonodes liquida is a moth of the family Noctuidae first described by Heinrich Benno Möschler in 1886. It is found from the southern United States (Florida) through St. Kitts, Cuba and Jamaica to the north of South America (Peru, Venezuela and French Guiana).

References

Moths described in 1886
Hadeninae